"The King Is Dead" is a song by British band Go West, released in 1987 as the third single from their second studio album Dancing on the Couch. It was written by Peter Cox and Richard Drummie, and produced by Gary Stevenson. "The King Is Dead" reached number 67 in the UK Singles Chart. The 12" version of the single featured a live version of "The King Is Dead" as the A-side, recorded live at the Hammersmith Odeon, London.

Background
The song features Kate Bush on backing vocals. While recording the song in Denmark, Go West felt it would benefit from the addition of backing vocals reminiscent of Bush's style. Guitarist Alan Murphy, who had worked with Bush in the past and was currently working with Go West on the recording of Dancing on the Couch, offered to contact her. Bush agreed to provide vocals, but rather than travel to Denmark due to her fear of flying, she recorded her part in her home studio.

Critical reception
Upon release, John Aixlewood of Number One commented, "Go West have nimbly swapped their simplistic loud songs for a simplistic quiet one. 'The King Is Dead' tries for that late night, smoke-filled bar feel, and ends sounding not a million miles away from the keyboard demonstrator on Sale of the Century. A musical version of the SDP." Andy Strickland of Record Mirror felt the song was superior to the duo's "usual effervescent adult pop" and described it as "some nice jazz/smooch that enables [Cox] to show off his tonsil technique to great effect". He added, "Star of the record is the piano player though, who rumbles and rolls across the last 20 seconds of this record like a Rip Rigger of old." In a retrospective review of Dancing on the Couch, Dan LeRoy of AllMusic noted the song was "incongruous but attractive cocktail jazz with an assist from Kate Bush".

Track listing
7" single
"The King Is Dead" - 4:28
"Little Caesar" - 4:39 (Recorded live at the Hammersmith Odeon, London)

12" single
"The King Is Dead (Live Version)" - 6:53
"Don't Look Down (Live Version)" - 4:54
"Little Caesar (Live Version)" - 4:29
"Call Me (Live Version)" - 3:43

Personnel

Go West
 Peter Cox - lead vocals, keyboards, percussion
 Richard Drummie - guitar, keyboards, percussion

Additional personnel on studio recordings
 Pino Palladino - bass guitar
 Alan Murphy - guitar
 Dave West - keyboards
 Tony Beard - drums
 Gary Stevenson - producer
 John Gallen - recording engineer
 Julian Mendelsohn - mixing engineer

Personnel on live recordings
 Peter Cox - lead vocals
 Richard Drummie - guitar, keyboards
 Alan Murphy - guitar
 Peter Adams - piano, keyboards
 Jaz Lochrie - bass
 Jimmy Copley - drums
  Linda Taylor, Maggie Ryder, Mo Birch, Peter Cox - backing vocals

Other
 Nick Knight - photography
 John Pasche - design
 Blueprint Management Ltd. - management

Charts

References

1987 songs
1987 singles
Go West (band) songs
Chrysalis Records singles
Songs written by Peter Cox (musician)
Songs written by Richard Drummie